Lost Children Archive is a 2019 novel by writer Valeria Luiselli. Luiselli was in part inspired by the ongoing American policy of separating children from their parents at the Mexican-American border. The novel is the first book Luiselli wrote in English.

The novel won the 2020 Rathbones Folio Prize and the 2021 International Dublin Literary Award. It was also longlisted for the 2019 Booker Prize and the 2019 Women's Prize for Fiction.

The novel details a cross-country journey from New York to Arizona in a car by a husband and wife, Mama and Papa, and their children, "the girl" and "the boy," both from previous relationships. The novel incorporates fragments from the poetry of other poets, including from poems by Anne Carson, Galway Kinnell, and Augusto Monterroso. The novel's climax, "Echo Canyon", consists of a single sentence that runs for 20 pages. The novel ends with 24 Polaroid photos provided by Luiselli, credited to the novel's fictional stepson.

Summary
An unnamed documentarian lives in New York City with her husband and their two children, his son from a previous relationship and her daughter from a previous relationship. 

The couple meet while recording a project on languages though she is a journalist and he works in acoustemology. They live together for several years, however the husband tells the woman that he has decided to record a project on the Apache that will take him to Arizona. The woman does not want to go, but realizes her husband is willing to leave her behind. Reluctantly, to slow the breaking of her marriage, she decides that she and the children will go with him to Arizona after which she and the girl, her biological child, will do research on her friend Manuela's daughters, two children who crossed the border seeking asylum and who have since gone missing in federal custody.

As they travel across the U.S. the father tells the children tales of the Apache and Geronimo, while the mother tells them of "Lost Children", Latin American migrants who travel across the border seeking refuge in the U.S. Both children begin to grow obsessed by these stories and combine them in their heads. The boy eventually believes that if he and the girl lose themselves they will be able to find Manuela's children and their parents, who will go searching for them, will be able to retrieve all four of them. The boy decides to leave with the girl, leaving behind a map for his parents to discover telling them they will reunite at Echo Canyon.

The boy and girl run off together, the girl unaware of what they are doing. While making the journey to Echo Canyon the boy reads a book his mother had been reading, Elegies for Lost Children. Eventually the characters of Elegies for Lost Children and the Boy and Girl merge; they meet in the desert where one of the Lost Children mocks the boy for believing he can find Manuela's daughters. The following morning the boy realizes the girl has given away all their supplies to the other children as they are close to being rescued. Miraculously they are, as they are near Echo Canyon.

After their scare the parents try their best to stay united as a family. However the Woman receives a call that Manuela's daughters were found deceased in the desert. The grief breaks the family apart and the mother and the girl depart.

Reception
According to literary review aggregator Book Marks, the novel received overwhelmingly positive reviews.

The book was named one of the top ten books of 2019 by the New York Times Book Review.
It was a finalist for the 2019 National Book Critics Circle Award for fiction.

In Media
In the second season of  The White Lotus, the character of Harper Spiller (played by Aubrey Plaza) reads Lost Children Archive.

Translation
The novel was translated into Spanish by Luiselli and Daniel Saldaña París with the title Desierto sonoro. It was released in e-book format by Vintage Español, an imprint of Knopf Doubleday, in September 2019 and in paperback format in October 2019.

Awards and nominations

References

2019 American novels
Alfred A. Knopf books
Novels about immigration to the United States
Travel novels
Fiction set in 2014
Novels set in the 2010s
Novels set in New York City
Novels set in New York (state)
Novels set in Virginia
Novels set in North Carolina
Novels set in Tennessee
Novels set in Memphis, Tennessee
Novels set in Arkansas
Novels set in Oklahoma
Novels set in Texas
Novels set in New Mexico
Novels set in Arizona